The 20th Biathlon European Championships were held in Bansko, Bulgaria from 20 to 26 February 2013.

Results

U26

Men's

Women's

U21

Men's

Women's

Mixed

Medal table

U26

U21

Total

References
 Official IBU web page

Biathlon European Championships
2013 in biathlon
International sports competitions hosted by Bulgaria
2013 in Bulgarian sport